The Robert Murray House is a historic house at 85 Crescent Street in Waltham, Massachusetts. The -story wood-frame house was built c. 1859, and was one of the earliest Italianate Victorian houses built in the area. It has classic Italianate styling, with a three-bay facade that has a small centered cross gable, and paired brackets in the eaves and gable ends. Its entry is sheltered by a porch with fluted Doric columns topped by a dentillated pediment.

The house was listed on the National Register of Historic Places in 1989.

See also
National Register of Historic Places listings in Waltham, Massachusetts

References

Houses in Waltham, Massachusetts
Houses on the National Register of Historic Places in Waltham, Massachusetts
Italianate architecture in Massachusetts
Houses completed in 1859